Valjarević is a surname. Notable people with the surname include:

Svetislav Valjarević (1911–1996), Serbian footballer
Vladimir Valjarević (born 1973), American classical pianist

Serbian surnames